The Oil Gush in Balakhany is a film directed by the pioneer of cinema in Azerbaijan, Alexandre Michon, it was filmed on August 4, 1898 in Balakhany, Baku and presented at the International Paris Exhibition. The film was shot using a 35mm film on a Lumière cinematograph and is considered the first film in Azerbaijani cinematography. It depicts a blowout from an oil well in the Balakhany village of Baku.

See also

List of Azerbaijani films before 1920

References

External links

1898 films
Azerbaijani silent short films
Azerbaijani short documentary films
Petroleum industry in Azerbaijan
Oil wells
1890s short documentary films
Films of the Russian Empire